María Belén Succi (born 16 October 1985) is an Argentine field hockey goalkeeper. She plays with the Argentina national field hockey team, winning  the bronze medal at the 2008 Summer Olympics in Beijing , and silver medal at the 2020 Summer Olympics.

Career 
She won the gold medal at the 2007 Pan American Games and 2019 Pan American Games, silver medal in 2015 Pan American Games and 2011 Pan American Games.

Belén also won the 2010 World Cup in Rosario, Argentina, six Champions Trophy, the World League 2014-15 and four Pan American Cups.

References

External links
 
 
 
 

1985 births
Living people
Argentine people of Italian descent
Las Leonas players
Argentine female field hockey players
Female field hockey goalkeepers
Olympic field hockey players of Argentina
Field hockey players at the 2008 Summer Olympics
Field hockey players at the 2011 Pan American Games
Olympic bronze medalists for Argentina
Pan American Games silver medalists for Argentina
Field hockey players from Buenos Aires
Olympic medalists in field hockey
Medalists at the 2008 Summer Olympics
Field hockey players at the 2015 Pan American Games
Field hockey players at the 2016 Summer Olympics
Field hockey players at the 2020 Summer Olympics
Pan American Games gold medalists for Argentina
Pan American Games medalists in field hockey
Field hockey players at the 2019 Pan American Games
sc
Medalists at the 2011 Pan American Games
Medalists at the 2015 Pan American Games
Medalists at the 2019 Pan American Games
Medalists at the 2007 Pan American Games
Olympic silver medalists for Argentina
Medalists at the 2020 Summer Olympics
21st-century Argentine women